Horst Stocker (born 22 August 1962) is an Austrian modern pentathlete. He competed at the 1984 Summer Olympics, finishing last in 52nd place in the individual event.

References

External links
 

1962 births
Living people
Austrian male modern pentathletes
Olympic modern pentathletes of Austria
Modern pentathletes at the 1984 Summer Olympics